South Kirkby and Moorthorpe is a civil parish in the metropolitan borough of the City of Wakefield, West Yorkshire, England.  The parish contains eight listed buildings that are recorded in the National Heritage List for England.  Of these, one is listed at Grade I, the highest of the three grades, and the others are at Grade II, the lowest grade.  The parish contains the town of South Kirkby and the village of Moorthorpe and the surrounding countryside.  Most of the listed buildings are farmhouses, houses and farm buildings, and the other listed building is a church.


Key

Buildings

References

Citations

Sources

 

Lists of listed buildings in West Yorkshire